Edward Bradford Pickett was an attorney, a Confederate Soldier, a Texas Senator, and the President of Texas Constitutional Convention.

Life
Pickett was born sometime in 1823 in Buckingham County, Virginia. He served as a private in the U. S. Army in the War against Mexico, sometime in 1845. It is his service in Texas that prompted his move to Texas. But before that, he married Virginia Orange Bell. During the 1850s, he served as a lawyer in several southeastern Texas counties. He also has a brother named Howell L. Pickett (1847-1914).

Politics
He was elected as a representative for the 1st district of the Texas House of Representatives from November 4, 1861 until March 1, 1862.

References

1823 births
1882 deaths
19th-century American politicians
Members of the Texas House of Representatives